The United Nations Special Rapporteur on the situation of human rights in the Islamic Republic of Iran is a United Nations Special Rapporteur whose mandate is to monitor and investigate human rights violations in Iran. The current Special Rapporteur is Javaid Rehman.   He is the sixth special rapporteur to Iran, following the tenures of Andrés Aguilar (1984–1986), Reynaldo Galindo Pohl (1986–1995), Maurice Copithorne (1995–2002), Ahmed Shaheed (2011–2016), and Asma Jilani Jahangir (2016–2018).

Tenures

Andrés Aguilar (1984–1986)
In 1984, the United Nations Commission on Human Rights (UNCHR) appointed Andrés Aguilar of Venezuela as its Special Representative to Iran on human rights. Iran refused to engage with him and he "eventually resigned, unable to persuade Iranian officials to cooperate with him in any way."

Reynaldo Galindo Pohl (1986–1995)
Galindo Pohl, a prominent diplomat and professor of law from El Salvador, served as the Special Representative from 1986 to 1995. He visited Iran three times between 1990 and 1992, but after his third visit, he was barred from visiting Iran.

Maurice Copithorne (1995–2002)
Following the resignation of Galindo Pohl, the UNCHR appointed Maurice Copithorne, a Canadian lawyer, as the Special Rapporteur. On 22 April 2002, the UNCHR voted not to renew the mandate of the Special Rapporteur, a decision condemned by Human Rights Watch (HRW) and the U.S. Commission on International Religious Freedom (USCIRF).

Ahmed Shaheed (2011-2016)
In March 2011, the UN Human Rights Council re-established this mandate, which the UNCHR had terminated in 2002, under the title Special Rapporteur on the situation of human rights in the Islamic Republic of Iran.  Ahmed Shaheed was the Special Rapporteur from 2011 to 2016. He went on to become the UN Special Rapporteur on Freedom of Religion or Belief. He was twice Foreign Minister of the Maldives from 2005 to 2007 and 2008 to 2010.

Asma Jahangir (2016–2018) 
Asma Jilani Jahangir was selected as the Special Rapporteur in 2016.  She was a human rights lawyer of Pakistani origin and a former President of the Supreme Court Bar Association of Pakistan.  She suffered from cardiac arrest in Lahore on 11 February 2018 and later died at the hospital.

Javaid Rehman (2018–) 
On 7 July 2018, Javaid Rehman was appointed as the United Nations Special Rapporteur on the human rights situation in the Islamic Republic of Iran

List

See also 
 High Council for Human Rights (Iran)

External links
 https://www.ohchr.org/en/special-procedures/sr-iran Site of the Special Rapporteur on the situation of human rights in the Islamic Republic of Iran

References

Human rights in Iran